Neocicada is a genus of cicadas in the family Cicadidae, with about five described species.

Species
These five species are:
 Neocicada australamexicana Sanborn and Sueur in Sanborn, Heath, Sueur and Phillips, 2005 i c g
 Neocicada centramericana Sanborn in Sanborn, Heath, Sueur and Phillips, 2005 i c g
 Neocicada chisos (Davis, 1916) i c g b (chisos cicada)
 Neocicada hieroglyphica (Say, 1830) i c g b (hieroglyphic cicada)
 Neocicada mediamexicana Sanborn in Sanborn, Heath, Sueur and Phillips, 2005 i c g
Data sources: i = ITIS, c = Catalogue of Life, g = GBIF, b = Bugguide.net

References

Further reading

External links

 

Articles created by Qbugbot
Leptopsaltriini
Cicadidae genera